The Iran Mall is the biggest shopping mall in the world in terms of area, and one of the largest commercial, cultural and social projects in the world, located in northwest Tehran, Iran, by Chitgar Lake.

The multi-purpose complex was designed on land with an area of 317,000 square meters and seven floors. Its infrastructure area in the first phase is 1,350,000 square meters, which will be increased to 1,600,000 square meters when all the development phases are completed.

The first phase with the capacity of 267,000 square meters of gross leasable area and 708 retail units was opened on 1 May 2018.

Over 1,200 contractors and 25,000 workers took part in the construction of Iran Mall. The facility is owned by Ayandeh Bank. The original idea of building such a large complex came from the well-known Iranian entrepreneur, Ali Ansari, who has also been the chief executive of constructing the Iran Mall.

International honours and records 
Iran Mall has attended Mapic for three years (from 2015 to 2017) and has also been awarded by RLI as the best-anticipated shopping mall in terms of dimensions and spaces of services, culture and entertainment in 2017.

According to the Guinness World Records, the longest continuous concrete pour has been completed in Iran Mall. This record was achieved between 1 and 6 March 2018.

Attractions

Traditional bazaar 
The traditional bazaar of Iran Mall is inspired by the markets of Tabriz, Isfahan, Shiraz, Qazvin, Qom, etc. The traditional bazaar of Iran Mall is a collection that has been designed and built based on historical patterns and methods of Iranian architecture about historical markets and related buildings. 

This complex with the Iranian-Islamic architecture is a venue for displaying and selling handicrafts, souvenirs and products from various parts of Iran.

The centre of the bazaar is the Chahar Souq. Chahar Souq divides the bazaar into 4 sections, and each store's space is between 500 and 1000 meters. The traditional bazaar with an area of about 10,000 square meters is located in the west side of Iran Mall.

Didar Garden 
Didar Garden's roof is 14 meters long; this roof is made of glass and it is decorated with fountains and palm trees. The design of Didar Garden, which has an area of 3,000 square meters, is inspired by the architectural brick designs of Iran's central regions, such as Yazd and Kashan.

Mahan Garden 
Mahan Garden with a width of 50 meters and an approximate length of 170 meters and an area of about 16,000 square meters has been built on three floors of the first to second commercial parking on five levels. Another feature of this garden is the design of its roof structure. For the first time in Iran, membrane coatings (ETFE) have been used to cover the roof of this building.

Mirror Hall 

One of the most prominent parts of the traditional bazaar is the Mirror Hall, which is based on the design of the Hall of Mirrors of the Golestan Palace. More than 38 million pieces of mirror have been worked into it, and carpet from Neyshabouri carpet weavers covers 126 square meters.

Traditional drink shop 
On the southeastern side of the traditional bazaar of Iran Mall, an area of 250 square meters is devoted to a traditional drink shop.

The Library 
The Iran Mall offers a separate structure known as the Jondishapour Library, named after Jondishapur University. The library uses earthy tones and a warm wood in its interior design to convey a sense of genuine Middle Eastern hospitality and comfort, and is built on three floors. It's equipped with more than 45,000 volumes of books, manuscripts, and documents. Separate reading studios also welcome those interested in reading books in a more secluded, private area. 

The statues displayed at Jondishapour library are of three important figures in Persian history. They are Ibn Sina (Persian: ابن سینا; 980 – June 1037 CE), commonly known in the West as Avicenna, Abu Ali Hasan ibn Ali Tusi (April 10, 1018 – October 14, 1092), better known by his honorific title of Nizam al-Mulk (Persian: نظام‌الملک, lit. 'Order of the Realm'), and Abu Rayhan Muhammad ibn Ahmad al-Biruni /ælbɪˈruːni/ (973 – after 1050), commonly known as al-Biruni.

Car showroom 
The car showroom is located in the west of Iran Mall with the aim of showcasing the latest technology in the automotive industry. A café is located in the centre of the exhibition.

COVID-19 
On 16 March 2020, for the first time in response to the COVID-19 pandemic, Iran Mall closed all its units and immediately set up a convalescent centre for patients with COVID-19. This convalescent centre was established in less than three days with a capacity of 3,000 beds at the Iran Mall Exhibition Centre and continued to operate for two months. The launch of this convalescent centre was widely reported in the domestic and international media. 

In May 2021, Iran mall vaccination centre started operating as one of the biggest vaccination zones in the country at Iran mall Exhibition Centre. The centre with a capacity of injecting more than 20,000 doses of vaccine was still providing services to citizens as of December 2021.

References 

Shopping malls in Iran
Shopping malls established in 2018
Buildings and structures in Tehran
Tourist attractions in Tehran